General Sir John Winthrop Hackett,  (5 November 1910 – 9 September 1997) was an Australian-born British soldier, painter, university administrator, author and in later life, a commentator.

Early life
Hackett, nicknamed "Shan", was born in Perth, Western Australia. His Irish Australian father, also named Sir John Winthrop Hackett (1848–1916), originally from Tipperary, was educated at Trinity College, Dublin (B.A., 1871; M.A., 1874), and he emigrated to Australia in 1875, eventually settling in Western Australia in 1882, where he became a newspaper proprietor and editor and a politician. His mother was Deborah Drake-Brockman whose parents were prominent members of Western Australian society. Her six siblings included Grace Bussell, famous for rescuing shipwreck survivors as a teenager and Frederick Slade Drake-Brockman, a prominent surveyor and explorer. 

On 3 August 1905, at 57, Hackett Sr married 18-year-old Deborah Drake-Brockman (1887–1965)—later Deborah, Lady Hackett; Deborah, Lady Moulden; and Deborah Buller Murphy—a director of mining companies. They had four daughters and a son. Hackett senior died in 1916. Lady Hackett remarried in 1918.

Hackett junior received secondary schooling at Geelong Grammar School in Victoria and then travelled to London to study painting at the Central School of Art. He then studied Greats and Modern History at New College, Oxford, earning an M.A. As his degree was not good enough for an academic career, Hackett joined the British Army and was commissioned into the 8th King's Royal Irish Hussars in 1933, having previously joined the Supplementary Reserve of Officers in 1931. During his military training, he completed a thesis in history with a focus on the crusades and the Early Middle Ages, particularly Saladin's campaign in the Third Crusade, for which he was awarded a B. Litt. He also qualified as an interpreter in French, German and Italian, studied Arabic and eventually became fluent in ten languages.

Family

He married Margaret Frena, daughter of Joseph Peter Frena, in Jerusalem Cathedral on 21 March 1942. Margaret outlived Hackett by a decade, dying on 14 May 2007. They had one child, Susan Veronica Hackett, born on 20 May 1945.

Early career
He served in Palestine during the Arab revolt, where he was mentioned in despatches in 1936, and then with the Trans-Jordan Frontier Force from 1937 to 1941, when he was mentioned in despatches.

Second World War

Hackett fought in the British Army in the Second World War Syria-Lebanon campaign: he was wounded and was awarded the Military Cross. During his recovery in Palestine, he met Margaret Fena, the Austrian widow of a German. Despite the difficulties caused by her nationality, they married in Jerusalem in 1942.

In the North African campaign, he commanded 'C' Squadron of the 8th Hussars (his parent unit) and was wounded again when his M3 Stuart tank was hit during the battles for Sidi Rezegh airfield. He was severely burnt when escaping the stricken vehicle. Whilst recuperating at GHQ in Cairo, he was instrumental in the formation of the Long Range Desert Group, the Special Air Service and Popski's Private Army.

In 1944, Hackett raised and commanded the 4th Parachute Brigade for the Allied assault on Arnhem, in Operation Market Garden. At the battle of Arnhem, Brigadier Hackett was severely wounded in the stomach, captured and then taken to the St. Elizabeth Hospital in Arnhem. A German doctor at the hospital wanted to administer a lethal injection to Hackett because he thought that the case was hopeless. However, he was operated on by Alexander Lipmann-Kessel, who, with superb surgery, managed to save the brigadier's life.

After a period of recuperation, he managed to escape with the help of the Dutch underground. Although he was unfit to be moved, the Germans were about to move him to a prisoner-of-war camp. He was taken by 'Piet van Arnhem', a resistance worker from Ede, and driven to Ede. They were stopped on the way but Hackett had extra bloody bandages applied to make him look even worse than he was. Piet told the checkpoint that they were taking him to hospital. They were let through despite the hospital being in the opposite direction from which they had just come.

He was hidden by a Dutch family, called de Nooij, who lived at No. 5 Torenstraat in Ede. The address no longer exists due to development. The family nursed the brigadier back to health over a period of several months; he then managed to escape to the Allied lines with the help of the underground. He remained friends with the de Nooijs for the rest of their lives and visited immediately after they were liberated, bearing gifts. Hackett wrote about the experience in his book I Was A Stranger, published in 1977. He received his second Distinguished Service Order for his service at Arnhem.

Later life
He returned to Palestine during the Palestine Emergency in 1947 where he assumed command of the Transjordan Frontier Force. Under his direction, the force was disbanded, as part of the British withdrawal from the region. He attended university at Graz, as a postgraduate in post-mediaeval studies and, after returning to the United Kingdom, he attended the Staff College, Camberley in 1951. After this, he was appointed to command the 20th Armoured Brigade and, on being promoted to major-general, assumed command of the 7th Armoured Division. In 1958, he became Commandant of the Royal Military College of Science at Shrivenham, and was promoted to lieutenant-general in 1961. He became General Officer Commanding-in-Chief (GOC-in-C), Northern Ireland Command, in 1961 and was knighted (KCB) on 2 June 1962. In 1963, he was appointed to Ministry of Defence as Deputy Chief of the Imperial General Staff (DCIGS), responsible for forces organisation and weapon development and became the leading figure in the reorganisation of the Territorial Army (TA), which made him unpopular. He relinquished his appointment on 4 February 1966.

On 14 April 1966, he was appointed command of the British Army of the Rhine (BAOR) and the parallel command of NATO's Northern Army Group, and his ability to speak several languages made him a natural choice, as did his friendship with foreign soldiers such as Johann von Kielmansegg of the Bundeswehr.

In 1968 he wrote a highly controversial letter to The Times that was critical of the British government's apparent lack of concern over the strength of NATO forces in Europe but signed the letter as a NATO officer, not as a British commander.

After his retirement from the army, he continued to be active in several areas. From 1968 to 1975, he was Principal of King's College, London. In 1978, he wrote a novel, The Third World War: August 1985, which was a fictionalized scenario of the Third World War based on a Red Army invasion of West Germany in 1985. It was followed in 1982 by The Third World War: The Untold Story, which elaborated on the original, including more detail from a Soviet perspective. An American author, Max Brooks, has cited Hackett's work as one source of inspiration for his novel, World War Z.

His (British) military decorations included the Knight Grand Cross of the Bath, Commander of the Most Excellent Order of the British Empire, Distinguished Service Order and Bar, Military Cross. His obituary in The Times called him a man of "intellect and prodigious courage."

Bibliography
Dates may not be reliable and are for guidance only.

 Popski's Private Army, 1950,  (Foreword only)
 The Profession of Arms, 1963, 
 I Was A Stranger, 1977, 
 The Third World War, 1978, 
 Third World War: Lecture, 1979 
 Arnhem Doctor, 1981,  (Foreword only)
 The Third World War: The Untold Story, 1982, 
 The Middle East Commandos, 1988,  (Foreword only)
 Warfare in the Ancient World, 1989, 
 The Desert Rats: History of the 7th Armoured Division, 1990,  (Introduction only)
 The Devil's Birthday: Bridges to Arnhem, 1944, 1992, 
 The History of the Glider Pilot Regiment: An Official History, 1992, 
 One Night in June, 1994, 1853104922 (Introduction only)
 Map of the D-Day Landings, 1994,  (Foreword only)
 To Save A Life, 1995,

Honours and awards

Sources:

Hackett was also mentioned in despatches six times:
1) 1936 Palestine
2) 1937 "Trans-Jordan Frontier Force"
3) 1937 "Trans-Jordan Frontier Force"
4) 1944 Italy
5) 1945 Arnhem
6) 1949 Palestine

Sources
 The Biography of General Sir John "Shan" Hackett GCB DSO MC, by Roy Fullick 2003,

References

External links
Biographical details, obituaries and photographs
John Hackett’s career timeline 
Account of Sir John Hackett's part in the Battle of Arnhem
Imperial War Museum Interview from 1979
Imperial War Museum Interview from 1991
Generals of World War II
1st British Airborne Division officers

Obituaries
Arthur, Max. 'Obituary – General Sir John Hackett' , The Independent (London), 11 September 1997, p. 12.
Obituary of General Sir John Hackett , The Times, 10 September 1997, p. 21.
Barker, Dennis. 'Obituary – General Sir John Hackett'  The Guardian (Manchester), 10 September 1997, p. 15.

|-

|-

|-

|-

|-

8th King's Royal Irish Hussars officers
1910 births
1997 deaths
British military personnel of the 1936–1939 Arab revolt in Palestine
British military personnel of the Palestine Emergency
Military personnel from Western Australia
People educated at Geelong Grammar School
Alumni of New College, Oxford
Australian people of World War II
British Army generals
British Army brigadiers of World War II
Australian Commanders of the Order of the British Empire
Australian Knights Grand Cross of the Order of the Bath
Principals of King's College London
Recipients of the Military Cross
Operation Pegasus
Australian Companions of the Distinguished Service Order
Transjordan Frontier Force officers
British military writers
Drake-Brockman family
Alumni of the Central School of Art and Design
Australian emigrants to England
Australian people of Irish descent
Graduates of the Staff College, Camberley
People from Perth, Western Australia